Keith Helfet is a South African automotive designer.

After demonstrating little academic promise in South Africa, Helfet turned to art. He had a natural affinity for automotive design and was accepted as a student into the most prestigious automotive styling programme in the world at the Royal College of Art in London.

A native of South Africa, Helfet became the Principal Stylist at Jaguar (car) where his work was admired by Sir William Lyons who had shaped the character of design at the brand for decades.

Helfet designed the Jaguar XJ-220, XK-180 and the stillborn Jaguar F-Type Concept Car.

Helfet now runs his own design company, Helfet Design.

References 

Brother-in-Law, The Designer

Building the Jaguar XK180 - An Exercise in Accelerated Development

THE JAGUAR XK180 A CONCEPT ROADSTER FOR THE NEW MILLENNIUM

Jaguar F-Type

Alumni of the Royal College of Art
Living people
Year of birth missing (living people)
South African automobile designers
South African motorsport people